Jeremy Mayer (born 1972, in Minnesota) is an American sculptor who uses typewriter parts and materials. He refers to his work as "cold assembly", as he does not use welding or glue.

Early life 
Mayer was born in Northern Minnesota in 1972. He moved to Northern California in 1990, and started his career in 1994.

Work 
Mayer does not use any power tools to disassemble the typewriters he uses, instead taking them apart by hand. When reassembling the typewriter components into his sculptures, he uses no welds, solder, glue, wire, or any material that is not part of a typewriter.  His works usually are of human figures, animals, and insects. His work has been displayed at the San Francisco Museum of Modern Art, the Salon Des Indomptables in Paris, the Nevada Museum of Art in Reno, and Ripley’s Believe It or Not museums.

He paid homage to the final set of Godrej & Boyce typewriters in a six-month stay in Mumbai. He lives and works in Oakland, California.

References 

1972 births
Living people
Sculptors from California
Artists from Oakland, California